Johannes Kirchmayer also known as John Kirchmayer (March 31, 1860 – November 29, 1930) was one of the leading woodcarvers in the United States, active primarily in the Boston area.

Kirchmayer was born in Oberammergau, Bavaria. After learning sculpture in Germany, he emigrated in 1880 to Boston and took up work mainly in church sculpture. He was a founding member of the Boston Society of Arts and Crafts with his work featured in an 1887 exhibition. After 1898, in the employ of Boston furnituremaking and architectural woodworking firm Irving and Casson, he worked on the buildings of the noted American Gothic-revivalist Ralph Adams Cram.

Kirchmayer's notable work around Boston includes carvings in The Church of the Advent, Brimmer Street, Boston; All Saints' Church, Ashmont, Dorchester; the Second Church, Newton; and Unity Church in North Easton. He also designed the mantling of the Anderson Memorial Bridge over the Charles River.

His work outside the Boston area includes carvings in Christ Church Cathedral, Springfield, MA; the Church of Saint Mary the Virgin, West 46th Street, New York City; St. Mary's Anglican Church, Windsor, Ontario; the Church of the Saviour, Syracuse, New York; and the James J. Hill House, St. Paul, Minnesota. At $1.00 an hour, he was the highest paid workman on the Hill House construction project.  He is also responsible for the carvings at Christ Church Cranbrook and on one door carved images of the craftsmen who worked on the church, including himself.

References 

 Hause der Bayerischen Geschichte (in German)
 Unity Church

1860 births
1930 deaths
People from Garmisch-Partenkirchen (district)
American woodcarvers
20th-century American sculptors
20th-century American male artists
19th-century American sculptors
19th-century American male artists
American male sculptors
German emigrants to the United States